Vukovići may refer to:

 Vukovići, Dobretići, a village in Bosnia and Herzegovina
 Vukovići (Hadžići), a village in Bosnia and Herzegovina
 Vukovići, Ravno, a village in Bosnia and Herzegovina
 Vukovići (Trebinje), a village in Bosnia and Herzegovina
 Vukovići, a hamlet of Poljanak, a village in the Plitvička Jezera municipality of Croatia